Morpeth is a community in Southern Ontario, Canada that is between Blenheim and St. Thomas on Highway 3 in the municipality of Chatham-Kent. It is located less than an hour and a half away from Windsor.

History

The community is named after Lord Morpeth, who was once a guest of Col. Thomas Talbot.
Morpeth was an area of notable commerce in the 1880s. However, when the railroad went through, it instead went through nearby Ridgetown, Ontario, which eventually grew faster than Morpeth.

Archibald Lampman, one of Canada's Confederation Poets, and "generally considered the finest of Canada's late 19th-century poets in English" (Canadian Encyclopedia) was born in Morpeth on November 17, 1861. The Dictionary of Canadian Biography says: "The Morpeth that Lampman knew was a small town set in the rolling farm country of what is now western Ontario, not far from the shores of Lake Erie. The little red church just east of the town, on the Talbot Road, was his father’s charge."

Commerce
Forms of commerce present in the village include a zoo, a trailer park, and a marina/campground. To the south, nearby Rondeau Provincial Park provides recreational activities. Morpeth is also an attractive retirement community, with housing available specifically for this need.

Tourism
Greenview Aviaries, a park and zoo, is located less than a mile east of the village in Ridgetown, Ontario on the former Highway 3. It attracts visitors from a wide area and has expanded over the years to house many additional animal species, including Big Cats (Tiger, Lions, Jaguars), Wild Game (Buffalo, Elk, Zebras), Primates, Reptiles and Birds.

Morpeth also sees a number of visitors traveling to nearby Rondeau Provincial Park  and to Wildwood By the Lake, a family campground.

References

External links
Chatham-Kent website

Communities in Chatham-Kent
Populated places on Lake Erie in Canada